The 2017 Puebla earthquake struck at 13:14 CDT (18:14 UTC) on 19 September 2017 with an estimated magnitude of  and strong shaking for about 20 seconds. The earthquake caused damage in the Mexican states of Puebla and Morelos and in the Greater Mexico City area, including the collapse of more than 40 buildings. 370 people were killed by the earthquake and related building collapses, including 228 in Mexico City, and more than 6,000 were injured.

The quake coincidentally occurred on the 32nd anniversary of the 1985 Mexico City earthquake, which killed around 10,000 people. The 1985 quake was commemorated, and a national earthquake drill was held, at 11 a.m. local time, just two hours before the 2017 earthquake.

Background

Mexico is one of the world's most seismically active regions, sitting atop several intersecting tectonic plates. The border between the Cocos Plate and North American Plate, along the Pacific Coast of Mexico, creates a subduction zone that generates large seismic events. Activity along the edges of the Rivera and Caribbean plates also generate seismic events. All together, these seismic forces cause an average of 40 earthquakes a day in Mexico.

Mexico City is built on a dry lakebed with soft soil made up of sand and clay, which amplifies the destruction that major earthquakes cause. This increases the shockwaves' amplitude, which causes more violent shaking. Deeper and denser soil layers increase amplified shockwaves' destructive duration.

Less than two weeks before the Puebla earthquake, Mexico had been struck by an earthquake in Chiapas on 7 September, which killed almost 100 people.

The possibility of a link between the earthquakes was being investigated in the days after the second one. Big earthquakes can increase the long-term risk of seismic activity by transferring "static stress" to adjacent faults, but only at a distance of up to four times the length of the original rupture. In the 19 September earthquake, static stress transfer was considered unlikely due to the distance between the earthquakes, in excess of the expected 400 km maximum. "Dynamic triggering", with seismic waves propagating from one quake affecting other faults, may operate at much longer distances, but usually happens within hours or a few days of the triggering quake; a 12-day gap is hard to explain.

19 September is designated as a day of remembrance for the 1985 Mexico City earthquake, which killed approximately 10,000 people. Every year at 11 a.m., a national earthquake drill is conducted by the government through the use of public loudspeakers located throughout Mexico City. The 2017 drill took place as scheduled, at 11 a.m., around two hours before the central Mexico earthquake.

Earthquake

The United States Geological Survey (USGS) placed the epicenter  ENE of San Juan Raboso and reported a measurement of VIII (Severe) on the Mercalli intensity scale. Post-earthquake surveys indicated a maximum intensity of IX (Violent) near the epicenter region. While there was a report of strong shaking for about one minute, which is a long time for an earthquake, acceleration/velocity/displacement seismograms at UNAM showed about 20 seconds of strong shaking with a period of ≈1 second. According to the USGS, the earthquake occurred on a moderately dipping normal fault.

According to the bulletin of Mexico's SASMEX earthquake warning system, 20 seconds' advance warning was given in Mexico City; however the general experience in the capital was that the alarm and cellphone alerts started only a few seconds before, or during the quake. Some residents reportedly mistook the alert for a continuation of the earlier drill. 25 of the early-warning seismic sensors detected the earthquake, and alerts were also provided to Oaxaca, Acapulco, Chilpancingo, and Puebla, with lead times stated to range from 12 to 48 seconds.

Casualties

Nine days after the earthquake, at least 361 people had been reported killed. At least 74 people were killed in the state of Morelos, 220 in Mexico City, 45 in Puebla, 13 in the State of Mexico, 6 in the state of Guerrero and one in the state of Oaxaca. The Mexico City campus of the Monterrey Institute of Technology and Higher Education suffered damage, with at least 5 people killed and 40 injured.

More than 6,000 people had been reported injured by the day after the earthquake, with more than 300 confirmed dead as Mexico earthquake rescue efforts continued.

On 1 October the number of people known to have been killed was stated to be 361, with more than 4,500 injured. By place, 220 were killed in Mexico City, 74 in the state of Morelos, 45 in Puebla, 15 in Mexico State, six in Guerrero, and one in Oaxaca.

An investigation published in October 2017 revealed that since 2012 there had been over 6,000 complaints about construction violations in Mexico City, with no public record of how many were followed up. Many of the buildings complained about collapsed in the 19 September earthquake. After the earthquake the Urban Development and Housing Secretariat (Seduvi) did not respond to requests for information on responses to complaints. Local activists called the construction system totally corrupt, and said that some developers circumvent building regulations, and city authorities frequently ignore complaints. Mónica García Villegas, the owner of Colegio Rébsamen in Mexico City where 26 people including 19 children died when the building collapsed, was found guilty on September 17, 2020 of "culpable homicide" for ignoring safety regulations. The Mexico City prosecutor (FGJ-CdMx) asked for 57 years of prison.

The casualties included eight foreigners, including four Taiwanese women, a Korean man, a Spanish man, a Panamanian woman and an Argentine man. The actress Cecilia Suárez was injured while filming The House of Flowers in Condesa, Mexico City.

Damage and aftermath
In Puebla, church steeples had toppled in the city of Cholula, and a church on the slopes of Popocatépetl in Atzitzihuacan collapsed during mass, killing 15 people. A second church, which was built in the 17th century, fell in Atzala during a baptism, killing 11 people including the baby.

At least 44 buildings collapsed in Mexico City due to the earthquake, trapping people inside, creating large plumes of dust, and starting fires. At least 50 to 60 people were rescued by emergency workers and citizens. Several buildings caught fire. Condesa, Roma and del Valle neighbourhoods were among those most affected in the zone: a building located on Álvaro Obregón Avenue collapsed, and several buildings on Ámsterdam Avenue suffered damage. The building housing the Philippine Embassy in Mexico City was badly damaged, requiring it to vacate the property.

Gas leaks were reported, along with "piles" of rubble from collapsed buildings. Stock prices declined at the Mexico Stock Exchange but recovered before trading was suspended. Comisión Federal de Electricidad, the national electric utility, reported that 4.78 million customers lost power in Guerrero, Morelos, Puebla, State of Mexico, Oaxaca, Tlaxcala, and parts of Mexico City—roughly 35% of the company's customers in those states. However, none of the generating stations in the region sustained structural damage.

Mexico City International Airport suspended operations while damage assessments took place, but reopened at 4:00 p.m. CDT (2100 UTC). 180 flights were cancelled or diverted during the closure. A plane carrying President Enrique Peña Nieto, returning from touring damage in Oaxaca from the earlier Chiapas earthquake, was diverted to Santa Lucía Air Force Base. Mexico City Metro service was temporarily cancelled on several subway lines due to a power failure, but restored by 17:30, offering free service to stranded passengers. Building evacuations also caused delays to Metrobús service in the city.

The federal Secretariat of the Interior (SEGOB) declared a state of emergency for all 33 municipalities of Morelos, for all 16 boroughs of Mexico City, and 112 of the 217 municipalities of Puebla. The declarations allow funds from the National Natural Disaster Fund (FONDEN) to be used during the emergency response phase. The Mexican Army and Mexican Navy deployed 3,000 active-duty troops to Mexico City through the DN-III-E and Plan Marina emergency response plans. The troops were tasked with debris cleanup, search and rescue, and security missions. Additionally, the Secretariat of National Defence moved eight helicopters to Mexico City, and activated 3 shelters in the affected areas.

A damage survey by American structural engineers revealed that a number of collapsed buildings had been erected in the 1960s and 1970s with unreinforced masonry walls confined by non-ductile concrete frames.

All Round of 16 matches of the Copa MX, an association football cup competition, were suspended until further notice.

The hashtag #FuerzaMéxico (Be strong, Mexico) was used on social media outlets.

Mexico's political parties offered to help victims in different ways, including the diverting some of the money they receive from the government for their campaigns. After months of debate and legal challenges, the donations were: PRI US$5,792,000, PAN US$2,479,000, PVEM US$524,000, Movimiento Ciudadano US$2,529,000, Encuentro Social US$506,000, PRD US$1,239,000, and Nueva Alianza US$2,081,000; Morena and PT did not specify how much they would donate. Although these amounts were not reported to the national election board Instituto Nacional Electoral.

International response

In response to the two major earthquakes in Mexico of September 2017, by the end of that month 501 rescue workers, 32 search dogs, equipment, and over 440 tonnes of humanitarian aid had been sent to Mexico from over 27 countries around the world.

Among the countries that came to Mexico's aid were Argentina, Canada, Chile, China, Colombia, Costa Rica, Ecuador, El Salvador, Germany, Honduras, Israel, Japan, Panama, Peru, Russia, Spain, South Korea, Switzerland, Turkey, the United States, the United Arab Emirates, the Vatican, and Venezuela, with aid coming from the United Nations and the European Union, as well.

Russia delivered 35 tonnes of aid supplies to Mexico, including 24.5 tonnes of canned goods, as well as 64 community-sized tents.

China shipped 3,000 tents along with more than 500 camp cots.

Canada sent 1,500 family-sized tents.

The Israel Defense Forces sent a group of 71 search and rescue soldiers including engineers, to help in the aftermath of the earthquake. The contingent had special dispensation to travel during the Rosh Hashanah holiday, normally forbidden under religious law.

The Japan International Cooperation Agency sent a disaster relief team of 72 search-and-rescue personnel, four search dogs and five tons of equipment with personnel from the Japan Disaster Relief Team, Tokyo Fire Department and the Tokyo Metropolitan Police's SAR officers. The Ministry of Foreign Affairs of the country remarked that it was a show of thanks, as Mexico had sent a search team to help Japan during the 2011 Tōhoku earthquake and tsunami.

Turkish state aid agency TİKA sent humanitarian aid – including packages containing hygienic and medical supplies prepared in coordination with the Mexican Red Cross – to Mexico City and Xochimilco. TIKA also provided tools and equipment to be used in search-and-rescue efforts.

US President Donald Trump called Peña Nieto to offer condolences, while the White House has offered search and rescue assistance. The U.S. Agency for International Development deployed an urban search and rescue team from the Los Angeles County Fire Department and experts from the Office of Foreign Disaster Assistance to the affected regions.

Celebrities who donated large sums include actress Salma Hayek ($100,000), Formula 1 driver Sergio Perez ($170,000), actress and singer Ana Brenda Contreras ($57,000), writer J. K. Rowling, singer Shawn Mendes ($100,000), Facebook founder Mark Zuckerberg ($1,000,000), Apple CEO Tim Cook ($1,000,000), and others.

Direct Relief, an emergency response organization, provided emergency response kits to a trauma hospital in southern Mexico City. They contained enough supplies to treat 1,000 people for a month. Direct Relief is also preparing shipments of medicines and medical supplies to improve its support to health care partners within the country.

Aftershocks

Reconstruction
652 homes were destroyed, 1,157 were damaged in Jojutla, Morelos, and many other buildings, including schools and the Palacio Municipal (city hall), were damaged in the earthquake. Two years later, in January 2020, residents were still waiting for reconstruction.

Nearly three-and-a-half years after the earthquake, in January 2021, César Cravioto, commissioner for reconstruction in Mexico City, reported that 53% (13,945 homes) of the buildings damaged had initiated rebuilding. Work will begin soon on 30% (8,030 homes), and work on 4,601 homes (17%) is undefined. 59 buildings have been demolished and 11 are scheduled to be demolished but have not started. Reconstruction of 21 buildings belonging to the Patrimonio Cultural Histórico are being attended to; 13 are in process and work has finished on eight. MXN $5.3 billion were budgeted for reconstruction from January 2019 to December 2020 and MXN $3.8 billion were spent.

Gallery

See also

 List of earthquakes in 2017
 List of earthquakes in Mexico

References

Further reading

External links

 Why Mexico City is so vulnerable to earthquakes – CNN
 A Shock WIthout Aftershocks – Berkeley Seismological Laboratory
 The Strange Tectonic Coincidence of Mexico's September Earthquakes – The New Yorker
 Chiapas and Puebla, Mexico, Earthquakes: Chain Reaction or Coincidence? – Temblor, Inc.
 
 

2010s in Mexico City
2017 earthquakes
2017
2017 Earthquake
History of Guerrero
History of Mexico City
History of Morelos
History of the State of Mexico
2017 in Mexico
September 2017 events in Mexico
2017 disasters in Mexico